Economic ethics is the combination of economics and ethics that unites value judgements from both disciplines to predict, analyze, and model economic phenomena. It encompasses the theoretical ethical prerequisites and foundations of economic systems. This particular school of thought dates back to the Greek philosopher Aristotle, whose Nicomachean Ethics describes the connection between objective economic principles and the consideration of justice. The academic literature on economic ethics is extensive, citing authorities such as natural law and religious law as influences on normative rules in economics. The consideration of moral philosophy, or that of a moral economy, is a point of departure in assessing behavioural economic models. The standard creation, application, and beneficiaries of economic models present a complex trilemma when ethics are considered. These ideas, in conjunction with the fundamental assumption of rationality in economics, create the link between economics and ethics.

History

Ancient economic thought 
Ancient Indian economic thought centred on the relationship between the concepts of happiness, ethics, and economic values, as the connections between them led to the constituting description of human existence. The Upanishads' fundamental idea of transcendental unity, oneness, and stability is a deduction of this relationship. Ancient Indian philosophy and metaphysics indicate an understanding of several modern economic concepts, for instance, their regulation of demand when it exceeded supply as a means of avoiding anarchy. This was achieved at the time by stressing that non-material goods were the source of happiness, which is a reflection of Marshall's dictum of the insatiability of wants. The Rig Veda illustrates an apprehension of economic inequality in chapter 10, stating that, "the riches of the liberal never waste away, while he who will not give finds no comfort in them." This indicates that generating personal wealth was not considered immoral, but rather that hoarding this wealth was a sin. The Arthasastra formulated laws that promote economic efficiency in the context of an ethical society. The author, Kautilya, posited that building infrastructure, which was the responsibility of the king, was a key determinant of economic growth when constructed in an ethical environment.

Ancient Greek philosophers often combined economic teachings with ethical systems. Socrates, Plato, and Aristotle subscribed to the idea that happiness was the most valuable good humans could strive for. The belief that happiness could not be achieved without pleasure posed complications to the relationship between ethics and economics at the time. Callicles, for example, held that one who lived rightly should gratify all their desires by way of their courage and practicality, which presented an anomaly for the issue of scarcity and the regulation of consumption. This was reconciled by the division of labour, where basic human wants such as food, clothing, and shelter were efficiently manufactured, given each limit their production to their most productive function, thus maximizing utility. Xenophon's Oeconomicus, inspired by Socrates' concept of eudaimonia, necessitates that, since virtue is knowledge, one should understand how to use money and property well rather than merely acquire it for personal gain.

Middle Ages 
Religion was at the core of economic life during the Middle Ages, hence the theologians of the time used inference from their respective ethical teachings to answer economic questions and achieve economic objectives. This was the approach also adopted by philosophers during the Age of Enlightenment. The Roman Catholic Church altered its doctrinal interpretation of the validity of marriage to, amongst alternate motivations, prevent competition from threatening its monopolistic market position. Usury was seen as an ethical issue in the Church, with justice having added value in comparison to economic efficiency. The transition from an agrarian lifestyle to money-based commerce in Israel led to the adoption of interest in lending and borrowing, as it was not directly prohibited in the Torah, under the ideal "that your brother may live with you." Economic development in the Middle Ages was contingent on the ethical practices of merchants, founded by the transformation in how medieval society understood the economics of property and ownership. Islam supported this anti-ascetic ethic in the role of merchants, given its teaching that salvation derives from moderation rather than abstinence in such affairs.

Classical economics 

The Labour Theory of Value holds that labour is the source of all economic value, which was the viewpoint of David Ricardo, Adam Smith, and other classical economists. The distinction between "wage-slaves" and "proper slaves" in this theory, with both being viewed as commodities, is founded on the moral principle that wage-slaves voluntarily offer their privately owned labour-power to a buyer for a bargained price, while proper slaves, according to Karl Marx, have no such rights. Mercantilism, although advocated by classical economics, is regarded as ethically ambiguous in academic literature. Adam Smith noted that the national economic policy favoured the interests of producers at the expense of consumers since domestically produced goods were subject to high inflation. The competition between domestic households and foreign speculators also led to an unfavourable balance of trades, i.e. increasing current account deficits on the balance of payments. Writers and commentators of the time employed Aristotle's ethical counsel to solve this economic dilemma.

Neoclassical economics 
The moral philosophy of Adam Smith founded the neo-classical worldview in economics, which states that one's quest for happiness is the ultimate purpose of life and that the concept of homo economicus describes the fundamental behaviour of the economic agent. Such an assumption as that individuals are self-interested and rational has implied the exemption of collective ethics. Under rational choice and neoclassical economics' adoption of Newtonian atomism, many consumer behaviours are disregarded, meaning that it often cannot explain the source of consumer preferences when not constrained by the individual. The role of collective ethics in consumer preference cannot be explained by neoclassical economics. This degrades the applicability of the market demand function, a key analytical tool, to real economic phenomena as a result. In principle, economists thus avoided, and continue to avoid, the assumptions of abstract economic models and the unique aspects of economic problems.

Contemporary history 
According to John Maynard Keynes, the complete integration of ethics and economics is contingent on the rate of economic development. Economists have been able to aggregate the preferences of agents, under the assumption of homo economicus, via the merging of utilitarian ethics and institutionalism. Keynes departed from the atomistic view of neoclassical economics with his totalistic perspective of the global economy, given that "the whole is not equal to the sum of its parts....the assumptions of a uniform and homogeneous continuum are not satisfied." This enforced the idea that an unethical socioeconomic state is apparent when the economy is under full employment, to which Keynes proposed productive spending as a mechanism to return the economy to full employment, the state where an ethically rational society exists.

Influences

Religion 

Philosophers in the Hellenistic tradition became a driving force to the Gnostic vision, the redemption of the spirit through asceticism that founded the debate regarding evil and ignorance in policy discussions. The amalgamation of ancient Greek philosophy, logos, and early Christian philosophy in the 2nd and 3rd centuries AD caused believers of the time to become morally astray. This led to the solution that they were to act in one's best interest, given appropriate reason, to prevent ignorance. The Old Testament of the Bible served as the source of ethics in ancient economic practices. Currency debasement was prohibited given its fraudulent nature and negative economic consequences, which were punished according to Ezekiel 22:18–22, Isaiah 1:25, and Proverbs 25:4–5. Relationships between economic and religious literature have been founded by the New Testament. For example, James 1:27 states that "looking after orphans and widows in their distress and keeping oneself unspotted by the world make for pure worship without stain before our God and Father," which supports the academic argument that the goal of the economic process is to perfect one's personality.

The concept of human capital valuation is evident in the Talmud. For example, an injured worker was considered a slave in the labour market while, for compensation purposes, their worth before and after injury, as well as their potential decline in income and consumption, was evaluated. The idea of opportunity cost is grounded in the "S'kbar B'telio" (literally meaning 'lost time') concept in Talmudic literature. In ancient Israel, a Rabbi was not to be paid for his work, as it would imply that he is profiting from preaching and interpreting the word of God, but would be compensated otherwise for the work completed as a Rabbi as a means of survival, given they are not involved in any other profession.

The Qur'an and the Sunnah have guided Islamic economic practice for centuries. For example, the Qur'an bans ribā as part of its focus on the eradication of interest to prevent financial institutions operating under the guidance of Islamic economics from making monopolistic returns. Zakat is in itself a system for the redistribution of wealth. The Qur’an specifies that it is intended solely for the poor, the needy, zakat administrators, those whose hearts are to be reconciled, those in bondage, those debt-ridden, those who strive for the cause of God, and the wayfarer. The use of Pension Loan Schemes (PLS) and other micro-finance schemes are exercised in this teaching through the inclusion of the Hodeibah micro-finance program in Yemen and the UNDP Murabahah initiatives at Jabal al-Hoss in Syria.

Culture 
Economic ethics attempts to incorporate morality and cultural value qualities to account for the limitation of economics, which is that human decision making is not restricted to rationality. This understanding of culture unites economics and ethics as a complete theory of human action. Academic culture has increased interest in economic ethics as a discipline. This led to an increased awareness of the cultural externalities of the actions of economic agents, as well as limited separation between the spheres of culture, which has purposed further research into their ethical liability. For example, a limitation of only portraying the instrumental value of a piece of artwork is that it may disregard its intrinsic value and thus should not be solely quantified. Artwork can also be considered a public good due to its intrinsic value, given its potential to contribute to national identity and educate its audience on its subject matter. Intrinsic value can also be quantified as it is incrementally valuable, regardless of whether it is sacred by association and history or not.

Application to economic methodologies

Experimental economics 

The development of experimental economics in the late 20th century created an opportunity to empirically verify the existence of normative ethics in economics. Vernon L. Smith and his colleagues discovered numerous occurrences that may describe economic choices under the veil of ignorance. Conclusions from the following economic experiments indicate that economic agents use normative ethics in making decisions while also seeking to maximise their payoffs. For example, in experiments on honesty, it is predicted that lying will occur when it increases these payoffs notwithstanding the results, which proved otherwise. It is found that people also employ the "50/50 rule" in dividing something regardless of the distribution of power in the decision making process. Experimental economic studies of altruism have identified it as an example of rational behaviour. The absence of an explanation for such behaviour indicates an antithesis in experimental economics in that it interprets morality as both an endogenous and exogenous factor subject to the case at hand. Research into the viability of normative theory as an explanation for moral reasoning is needed, with the experimental design focused on testing whether economic agents under the conditions assumed by the theory produce the same decisions as those predicted by the theory. This is given that, under the veil of ignorance, agents may be "non-tuist" in the real world as the theory suggests.

Behavioural economics 
Ethics in behavioural economics is ubiquitous given its concern with human agency in its aim to rectify the ethical deficits found in neoclassical economics, i.e., a lack of moral dimension and lack of normative concerns. The incorporation of virtue ethics in behavioural economics has facilitated the development of theories that attempt to describe the many anomalies that exist in how economic agents make decisions. Normative concerns in economics can compensate for the applicability of behavioural economic models to real economic phenomena. Most behavioural economic models assume that preferences change endogenously, meaning that there are numerous possible decisions applicable to a given scenario, each with an ethical value. Hence, there is caution in considering welfare as the highest ethical value in economics, as conjectured in academic literature. As a result, the methodology also employs order ethics in assuming that progress in morality and economic institutions is simultaneous, given that behaviour can only be understood in an institutional framework. There are complications in applying normative inferences with empirical research in behavioural economics, as there is a fundamental difference between descriptive and prescriptive inference and propositions. For example, the argument against the use of incentives, that they force certain behaviours in individuals and convince them to ignore risk, is a descriptive proposition that is empirically unjustified.

Application to economic sub-disciplines

Environmental economics 

Welfare is maximized in environmental economic models when economic agents act according to the homo economicus hypothesis. This creates the possibility of economic agents compensating sustainable development for their private interests, given that homo economicus is restricted to rationality. Climate change policy as an outcome of inference from environmental economics is subject to ethical considerations. The economics of climate change, for example, is inseparable from social ethics. The idea of individuals and institutions working companionably in the public domain, as a reflection of homo politicus, is also an apposite ethic that can rectify this normative concern. An ethical problem associated with the sub-discipline through discounting is that consumers value the present more than the future, which has implications for intergenerational justice. Discounting in marginal cost-benefit analysis, which economists view as a predictor for human behaviour, is limited concerning future risk and uncertainty. The use of monetary measures in environmental economics is based on the instrumentalisation of natural things, which is inaccurate in the case that they are intrinsically valuable. Other relationships and roles between generations can be elucidated through adopting certain ethical rules. The Brundtland Commission, for example, defines sustainable development as that which meets present needs without compromising the ability of future generations to do so, which is a libertarian principle. Under libertarianism, no redistribution of welfare is made unless all generations are benefited or unaffected.

Political economy 
Political economy is a subject fundamentally based on normative protocol, focusing on the needs of the economy as a whole by analyzing the role of agents, institutions, and markets, as well as socially optimal behaviour. Historically, morality was a notion used to discern the distribution of these roles and responsibilities, given that most economic problems derived from the failure of economic agents to fulfil them. The transition of moral philosophy from such ethics to Kantian ethics, as well as the emergence of market forces and competition law, subjected the moral-political values of the moral economy to rational judgement. Economic ethics remains a substantial influence on the political economy due to its argumentative nature, evident in the literature concerning government responses to the global financial crisis. One proposition holds that, since the contagion of the crisis was transmitted through distinct national financial systems, future global regulatory responses should be built on the distributive justice principle. The regulation of particular cases of financial innovation, while not considering critiques of the global financial system, functionally normalizes perceptions on the system's distribution of power such that it lessens the opportunities of agents to question the morality of such practice.

Development economics 
The relationship between ethics and economics has defined the aim of development economics. The idea that one's quality of life is determined by one's ability to lead a valuable life has founded development economics as a mechanism for expanding such capability. This proposition is the basis of the conceptual relationship between it and welfare economics as an ethical discipline, and its debate in academic literature. The discourse is based on the notion that certain tools in welfare economics, particularly choice criterion, hold no value-judgement and are Paretian, given that collective perspectives of utility are not considered. There are numerous ethical issues associated with the methodological approach of development economics, i.e. the randomised field experiment, many of which are morally equivocal. For example, randomisation advantages some cases and disadvantages others, which is rational under statistical assumptions and a deontological moral issue simultaneously. There are also ethical implications related to the calculus, the nature of consent, instrumentalisation, accountability, and the role of foreign intervention in this experimental approach.

Health economics 
In health economics, the maximized level of well-being being an ultimate end is ethically unjustified, as opposed to the efficient allocation of resources in health that augments the average utility level. Under this utility-maximizing approach, subject to libertarianism, a dichotomy is apparent between health and freedom as primary goods due to the condition of one is necessary to have to attain the other. Any level of access, utilization, and funding of healthcare is ethically justified as long as it accomplishes the desired and needed level of health. Health economists instrumentalise the concept of a need as that which achieves an ethically legitimate end for a person. This is based on the notion that healthcare is not intrinsically valuable, but morally significant because it contributes to overall well-being. The methodology of analysis in health economics, with respect to clinical trials, is subject to ethical debate. The experimental design should partially be the responsibility of health economists given their tendency to otherwise add variables that have the potential to be insignificant. This increases the risk of under-powering the study, which in health economics is primarily concerned with cost effectiveness, which has implications for evaluation.

Application to economic policy 

Academic literature presents numerous ethical views on what constitutes a viable economic policy. Keynes believed that good economic policies are those that make people behave well as opposed to those that make them feel well. The Verein für socialpolitik, founded by Gustav von Schmoller, insists that ethical and political considerations are critical in evaluating economic policies. Rational actor theory in the policy arena is evident in the use of Pareto optimality to assess the economic efficiency of policies, as well as in the use of cost–benefit analysis (CBA), where income is the basic unit of measurement. The use of an iterative decision-making model, as an example of rationality, can provide a framework for economic policy in response to climate change. Academic literature also presents ethical reasoning to the limitation associated with the application of rational actor theory to policy choice. Given that incomes are dependent on policy choice and vice versa, the logic of the rational model in policy choice is circular, hence the possibility of wrong policy recommendations. Additionally, many factors increase one's propensity to deviate from the modelled assumptions of decision making. It is argued under self-effacing moral theory that such mechanisms as CBA may be justified even if not explicitly moral. The contrasting beliefs that public actions are based on such utilitarian reckonings and that all policy-making is politically contingent justifies the need for forecasting, which itself is an ethical dilemma. This is founded on the proposition that forecasts can be amended to suit a particular action or policy rather than being objective and neutral. For example, the code of ethics of the American Institute of Certified Planners provides inadequate support for forecasters to avert this practice. Such canons as those found in the Code of Professional Ethics and Practices of the American Association for Public Opinion Research are limited in regulating or preventing this convention.

See also 

 Economic ideology
 Socioeconomics
 Normative economics
 Political economy
 Ethical consumerism
 Philosophy and economics

References

Further reading 

 DeMartino, G. F., McCloskey, D. N. (2016). The Oxford Handbook of Professional Economic Ethics. New York, USA: Oxford University Press. 
 
Rich, A. (2006). Business and Economic Ethics: The Ethics of Economic Systems. Leuven, Belgium: Peeters Publishers.  
Sen, A. (1987). On Ethics and Economics. Carlton, Australia: Blackwell Publishing. 
Ulrich, P. (2008). Integrative Economic Ethics: Foundations of a Civilized Market Economy. New York, USA: Cambridge University Press. 

Ethics
Interdisciplinary subfields of economics
Religious belief and doctrine